Des Kelly is a British journalist.

Des or Desmond Kelly may also refer to:

Des Kelly (footballer)
Desmond Kelly, Ceylonese musician
Des Kelly (racing driver) in 1966 Gallaher 500
Desmond Kelly (dancer) at Elmhurst School for Dance
Des Kelly (businessman), an Irish businessman